Urho Sirén (17 June 1932 – 27 November 2002) was a Finnish cyclist. He competed in the 4,000 metres team pursuit event at the 1952 Summer Olympics.

References

1932 births
2002 deaths
Finnish male cyclists
Olympic cyclists of Finland
Cyclists at the 1952 Summer Olympics
Sportspeople from Helsinki